The butterfly rays are the rays forming the genus Gymnura and the family Gymnuridae. They are found in warm oceans worldwide, and occasionally in estuaries.

The body of butterfly rays is flattened and surrounded by an extremely broad disc formed by the pectoral fins, which merge in front of the head. They have a very short, thread-like, tail.

McEachran et al. place the butterfly rays in the subfamily Gymnurinae of the family Dasyatidae, but this article follows FishBase and ITIS in treating them as a family.

Species
There are currently 12 species in this genus (others are considered synonyms):

 Gymnura altavela (Linnaeus, 1758) – Spiny butterfly ray
 Gymnura australis (E. P. Ramsay & Ogilby, 1886) – Australian butterfly ray
 Gymnura crebripunctata (W. K. H. Peters, 1869) – Longsnout butterfly ray
 Gymnura japonica (Temminck & Schlegel, 1850) – Japanese butterfly ray
 Gymnura marmorata (J. G. Cooper, 1864) – California butterfly ray
 Gymnura micrura (Bloch & J. G. Schneider, 1801) – Smooth butterfly ray
 Gymnura natalensis (Gilchrist & W. W. Thompson, 1911) – Backwater butterfly ray
 Gymnura poecilura (G. Shaw, 1804) – Longtail butterfly ray
 Gymnura tentaculata J. P. Müller & Henle, 1841 – Tentacled butterfly ray
 Gymnura zonura Bleeker, 1852 – Zonetail butterfly ray
Gymnura lessae Yokota & Carvalho, 2017– butterfly ray
Gymnura sereti Yokota & Carvalho, 2017– butterfly ray

References

Gymnuridae
Taxa named by Johan Conrad van Hasselt